Grace Ives (born April 3, 1995) is an American singer-songwriter. Her music has been positively reviewed by publications including Stereogum who featured her on their Best New Bands of 2019 list and Pitchfork who awarded her second studio album Janky Star (2022) their Best New Music rating.

Early life and education
The daughter of a cinematographer (Tim Ives) and a creative director in the music industry, Ives went to college at Maryland Institute College of Art in Maryland before transferring to the State University of New York at Purchase, where she majored in New Media and began working on music in her dorm room.

Career
In August 2022, she performed her song "Lullaby" on Jimmy Kimmel Live!.

Ives was the support act for Swedish singer Lykke Li on her North American tour supporting new studio album Eyeye (2022).

Equipment
 Roland MC-505

Discography
 2nd (2019)
 Janky Star (2022)

References

External links
 
 

Living people
21st-century American singers
21st-century American women singers
American electronic musicians
American women in electronic music
Singers from New York City
Year of birth missing (living people)